Henrdrik Pieter "Harry" Stroo (2 October 1927, Zaandam – 18 July 1991, Zaandam) was a Dutch sprint canoer who competed in the late 1940s. He finished sixth in the K-2 10000 m event at the 1948 Summer Olympics in London.

References

1927 births
1991 deaths
Canoeists at the 1948 Summer Olympics
Dutch male canoeists
Olympic canoeists of the Netherlands
Sportspeople from Zaanstad
20th-century Dutch people